The Lokehellene Cliffs are steep rock cliffs which form the west side of Nupsskarvet Mountain, in the Kurze Mountains of Queen Maud Land, Antarctica. They were mapped from surveys and air photos by the Sixth Norwegian Antarctic Expedition (1956–60) and named Lokehellene (Loki slopes) after Loki, a god of Norse mythology.

References

External links

Cliffs of Queen Maud Land
Princess Astrid Coast